Nawab Ali (1902–1977) was a Bangladeshi physician and academic. He was an elected member of East Pakistan provincial assembly. He was also principal of Dhaka Medical College.

Early life 
He was born at Matlab Uttar of Chandpur in the then undivided India (now in Bangladesh) in 1902.

Education and career 
Ali passed entrance from Munshiganj High School and HSC from Dhaka College. He passed MBBS from Calcutta Medical College, Calcutta in 1927. He obtained MRCP in 1944. He received FRCP in 1958.

Ali was a renowned professor of medicine who served as the head of the department of medicine and principal of Dhaka Medical College. He was also the dean of the faculty of medicine of University of Dhaka. He was the president of the organization that was then known as the All Pakistan Medical Association. He founded a diarrhoeal disease hospital under ICDDR,B at Matlab. He was elected as a member of East Pakistan legislative assembly in 1962.

Death 
Ali died on August 4, 1977 in Dhaka.

Honors 
Jatiya Sangsad passed an obituary reference on him in 2003 and the postal department issued a first-day cover and stamp in his honour in 2005.

References 

1902 births
1977 deaths
People from Matlab Uttar Upazila
20th-century Bangladeshi physicians
Medical College and Hospital, Kolkata alumni
Dhaka College alumni
20th-century Pakistani physicians